Nusrat al-Islam, officially known as Jama'a Nusrat ul-Islam wa al-Muslimin' (JNIM; , GSIM English: Support Group for Islam and Muslims) is a militant jihadist organisation in the Maghreb and West Africa formed by the merger of Ansar Dine, the Macina Liberation Front, Al-Mourabitoun and the Saharan branch of Al-Qaeda in the Islamic Maghreb. It is the official branch of Al-Qaeda in Mali, after its leaders swore allegiance to Ayman al-Zawahiri.

History 
On 2 March 2017, Iyad Ag Ghaly, Al Murabitoun's deputy leader, Hassan Al Ansari, Yahya Abu Hammam, Amadou Kouffa, and Abu Abderaham al-Sanhaji appeared in a video declaring the creation of Jama'a Nusrat ul-Islam wa al-Muslimin, and their allegiance to al-Qaeda Emir Ayman al-Zawahiri, AQIM's Emir, Abdelmalek Droukdel, and Taliban Emir, Hibatullah Akhundzada. They also praised killed al-Qaeda leaders Osama Bin Laden and Abu Musab al-Zarqawi. On 16 March, Abdelmalek Droukdel released an audio message, approving the union between the groups. On 19 March, Al-Qaeda issued a statement approving the new group and accepting their oath of allegiance.

Two leaders sanctioned by the US Treasury's office were named as Ali Maychou and Bah Ag Moussa. Moussa was a former Malian army colonel who led an operation in March 2019 against the Malian Armed Forces base in Dioura that killed at least 21 Malian soldiers. Maychou was a native of Morocco who had claimed responsibility for a JNIM attack on a military camp that housed Malian troops in Gao, killing dozens. The Treasury office said Maychou held an operational role in JNIM's activities, while Moussa acted on behalf of JNIM's leader Iyad Ag Ghaly. In 2021, two additional leaders were designated as Specially Designated Global Terrorists: Sidan Ag Hitta and Salem ould Breihmatt.

The French government declared that 50 jihadists linked to the al-Qaeda group were killed in central Mali during an operation launched by the French anti-jihadist Barkhane force on 30 October 2020. The French force also confiscated arms and material and captured four of the jihadists live, as per French Defense Minister Florence Parly. The French authorities also confirmed the death of a key JNIM leader Bah ag Moussa with four of his group. He was in charge of terrorist operations and training new extremist recruits. France has deployed more than 5,000 troops in the Sahel region to combat insurgents.

Four of the Chadian Peacekeepers were killed in the assault, and 34 wounded. Initial reports suggested that approximately 20 of the jihadists had been killed, a number that was later revised to 40, including Abdallaye Ag Albaka. Ag Albaka was described as "a right-hand man to Iyad Ag Ghaly", and unofficially as the Number 3 man in the organization.

Aims and support
The Center for Strategic and International Studies describes JNIM as "an al Qaeda-affiliated Salafi-jihadist insurgent organization that seeks to replace established state authority with a conservative interpretation of Islamic law."

The Africa Center for Strategic Studies has said that JNIM does not have wide popular support.

References 

Organizations designated as terrorist by Iraq
Organisations designated as terrorist by the United Kingdom
Organizations designated as terrorist by the United States
Organizations based in Africa designated as terrorist
Jihadist groups in Algeria
Rebel groups in Burkina Faso
Rebel groups in Mali
Rebel groups in Niger
Salafi Jihadist groups
2017 establishments in Africa